Captain Flamingo is an animated television series, which chronicles the adventures of Milo Powell, whose alter-ego is Captain Flamingo. The television series was produced by Atomic Cartoons, Breakthrough Films & Television, The Heroic Film Company and PASI Animation, and premiered on YTV on February 7, 2006, and ended on April 17, 2008.

The titular character is of unspecified young age. He has no real super-powers of note, just a desire to help "li'l kids" in trouble. His "superpowers" take the form of novelty items, such as a whoopee cushion, among other things.

Plot
Milo Powell is an ordinary young Japanese-Canadian boy, living in Halverston-in-Area (a fictional neighbourhood in Toronto, Ontario), until a kid is in trouble. Any time a kid yells "Uh-oh! Flamingo!", Milo transforms into Captain Flamingo, whose mission is to help little kids who need assistance. Captain Flamingo is aided in his missions by his best friend Lizbeth Amanda Zaragoza, who apparently has a not-so-secret crush on him. CF also has a little brother named Thor.

Quite often, when called upon to carry out a mission, Captain Flamingo is busily engaged with something else, a personal goal or problem (such as waiting in line to buy an ice cream before the truck leaves or runs out of ice cream, but someone calls to him, needing his help); like a true hero, he must, and usually does, put aside his own needs to help others (although, quite often, his actions in successfully aiding the person in distress lead to a successful outcome for his personal goals).  Captain Flamingo seldom successfully solves a problem on his first try; in fact, it is not uncommon for his initial attempts to make things worse. In trying to solve the simple problems of other little kids he encounters (such as, say, a lost pencil or a missing sock), Captain Flamingo often gets into tight spots. He has, in various episodes, gotten trapped in a bubble with a full bladder, gone underwater to battle an eel, and has gotten trapped in a deadly matrix of bouncing superballs. Despite this, he never gives up and meets every failure or setback with a new attempt. He eventually gets out of these situations by using his "Bird Brain"; this can be his own instincts, but it usually is Lizbeth. A random thought he speaks aloud might be picked up on by Lizbeth and elaborated into an actual, detailed plan (which Lizbeth will assume was what Captain Flamingo planned to do all along), or he can assume that a suggestion spoken aloud by Lizbeth is his "Bird Brain" speaking to him (although he usually misinterprets her suggestion; however, his misinterpretation usually works). In the end, Captain Flamingo always seems to stumble upon a solution either through Lizbeth's cleverness, persistent refusal to give up, and constantly trying new novelty items and plans until he succeeds, or sheer luck (or, quite often, some combination of the three).

Characters

Main
 Milo Powell/Captain Flamingo: (voiced by Tabitha St. Germain) Motivated, driven Milo Powell is equipped with the imagination and faith to become a superhero. He stands proudly in his homemade super-tights, his unwieldy flamingo-beak helmet and terry cloth cape, ready to take on an outsized world! With Milo, things rarely turn out as planned, but somehow they do always manage to turn out all right. He carries a heavy heroic burden because kids everywhere rely on him, so he approaches their problems with utmost seriousness—as if the fate of their world depended on it (and maybe it does!). In the episode "Switch Hitch", where Wendell and Milo switched lives, Milo seemed quite jealous of Wendell's feelings towards Lizbeth. It is later revealed that he may love her. When Lizbeth and the rest of his friends were walking away with an imposter in that episode, he shouted "Lizbeth, I love you-I mean how you...". He was also impersonated in "Captain Copycat" by the Warrior Monkey (which Milo managed to counter the incident by impersonating the Warrior Monkey). He is a Lemming Scout, a fan of horror movies, and can understand the animal languages.
 Lizbeth Amanda Zaragoza: (voiced by Melanie Tonello) The Captain's best friend, sidekick, and not-so-secret Chinese-Filipino Canadian admirer, Lizbeth is focused and organized, however, she's just a puddle of emotions when it comes to Milo Powell, her favourite square-shaped boy. She's a devoted follower and chronicler of his heroics, and, unbeknownst to him, is the voice of the "birdbrain" that often inspires the Captain to save the day. Lizbeth is strong and smart but a bit of a loner because of it. Her best friend, besides Milo, is her monocled stuffed elephant confidante, Chester. Lizbeth is secure in the knowledge that girls mature faster than boys, so she knows one day Milo will catch up and appreciate her. So, for now, she's willing to guide him along and wait patiently for that special day. She acts so because Milo saved her life when they were babies when Lizbeth nearly fell out of the sandbox onto the concrete sidewalk and Milo threw himself in front of her to save her, and never forgets about it (although witnesses say that what really happened was that Milo became distracted by a butterfly, and, unable to concentrate and keep himself up at the same time, fell into a heap, unintentionally saving her). She has an allergy to several animals and plants according to "Rare Basement Window". 
 Thor Powell: (voiced by Nissae Isen) Thor is Milo's diaper-clad baby brother. Thor likes to crawl after Milo and ride his cape. And he likes to slobber on Milo's tights. As Thor's primary babysitter, Milo often has to juggle his younger brother and his work—sometimes literally.
 Margerie Powell (Milo's real mother): (voiced by Kathy Greenwood) Milo's Japanese mother has her own life as an ornithologist. She loves her boys, but adult schedules and family events come first before little kids' desires. She's very huggy and supportive, but also extremely practical and firm. If she's said 'no' twice, Milo knows asking a third time would be foolhardy. Her first name was revealed to be Margerie by a young Mr. Powell in the episode.
 David Ignacius Powell (Milo's real father):  (voiced by Richard Waugh) Deadpan, monotone, and humourless, Milo's father ironically runs a humour and novelty store where Milo gets his joke products from. With a voice that borders on deep-funereal, David is still somehow a warm guy, despite his overall stiffness. His full name was revealed in the episode "Fault Line" by Milo's mother.
 Owen-Only: (voiced by Scott Beaudin) Owen is the sole overprotective kid. He's been padded, helmeted, and parentally locked out of most of the thrills of being a kid. And pop-culturally, he's way behind. This character has never tasted junk food, felt the wind in his hair while riding his scooter, or told a joke where the punch line was "poo." So you have to forgive him for not getting stuff, or always stating the obvious, to the point of being really annoying sometimes. Given what he's up against, you gotta love the guy. Sugar makes Owen extremely hyperactive, his personality goes from sensible to lunatic if he gets even a taste of sugar.
 Rutger (voiced by Demetrius Joyette) - Rutger is an African-Canadian kid, who always bites off more than he can chew. He's excitable, somewhat like a puppy, and has no lack of confidence. But with his maverick demeanour, he's always getting himself into trouble by taking stuff on before he's ready or big enough to do it. For instance, rather than ride a dumb little dinghy in the wading pool, he'll construct a massive Titanic-like behemoth out of random floatie toys—only to have it sink dramatically, with him on board. The only kid who thinks as big as he does is the Captain; a good thing, as Rutger frequently requires his services. Rutger is a goalie in one of Halverston's hockey teams.
 Max Roderick (voiced by Isabel de Carteret) - Max is one of the smartest, most sophisticated kids on the block. It's not his fault he's two feet tall and has a ridiculous Elmer Fudd or Tweety-like (a reference to Looney Tunes characters) speech problem where his r's turn into w's, and he often adds w's to his l's. Therefore, 'really' becomes 'reawwy' and 'small' becomes '.' Luckily, Captain Flamingo gets him out of trouble. A lot. Max reveals his last name is Roderick in the episode "Max Invader, Scourge Of The Universe". Also in that episode, he has his own alter ego, "Max Invader".
 Avi (voiced by Matthew Ferguson) - Avi, aka 'The Avalanche Kid' is a kid that has a real knack for disaster. Is it a bad moon that hangs over his head or just the overlong bangs that hang in his eyes? Whatever the cause, Avi is seriously dexterity-challenged. All it takes from him is one "uh-oh" move to start an inevitable chain of mounting disasters. Captain Flamingo doesn't mind cleaning up Avi's messes, usually, but sometimes he wishes Avi would plan and call ahead, because, let's face it: if he's going with his mother to the china shop on Monday, Milo really should book the week off. Avi has three identical-looking younger sisters, who seem to have inherited Avi's ability to be a walking disaster, which also seems to run in his family.
 Wendell Howell (voiced by Cole Caplan) - Wendell is Milo's cousin and nemesis. He and Milo are always competing against each other. Wendell loves to point out how much better he is than Milo at everything (due mostly to the fact that he is, as he never lets Milo forget, an eighth of an inch taller than Milo, but that is the only way he is superior to him). A bit of a geek, Wendell always looks for a mathematical or scientific way to gain the upper hand over Milo. He later invents his own superheroic alter ego, Commander Whooping Crane (He chose this name because Whooping Cranes are taller than Flamingos by a good eighth of an inch) who almost replaced Milo as the neighbourhood hero until he got into trouble and had to be saved by CF. In the episode "Switch Hitch", where Milo and Wendell switched lives, Wendell seemed to have feelings for Lizbeth. However, these feelings were not given back. Wendell's last name is revealed to be Howell in "Scrambled Legs".
 Tabitha (voiced by Rebecca Brenner) - Tabitha is a girl who has two settings: freaked out, and really freaked out. She's on life's fast track; every moment of every day is scheduled, and she plans to finish university and have an established medical career by the time most of us are just finishing breakfast. Tabitha's many playdates, lessons, and various 'opportunities for growth' keep her busy, frazzled, and close to implosion. But when someone's life moves as fast as hers does, things eventually slip—and the Captain is always there to pick up the pieces. Her dirty blonde frizzy hair is a simple indicator of her stress level. The more stressed she is, the wilder it gets - much to her dismay. She has a brother who loves drums and a toddler brother named Tucker who's into streaking!
 Sanjay (voiced by Stacey DePass) - Easily distracted, Sanjay is an Indian-Canadian kid voted "Most likely to walk into a tree while following a bird call," or "Most likely to trip into a manhole while reading and jogging at the same time." In fact, he may not even notice that he's in the middle of being saved by the fearless yet focused Captain. He has nyctophobia.
 Otto (voiced by Catherine Disher) - Otto could well be a genius....or he could be a complete wacko. We'll only know for sure after he's grown up. But for now, he builds robots that go bad, constructs alternate universes that spin out of his control, and collects rocks that include most of the planet's ore supply. But the Captain saves Otto frequently and unquestioningly—and might even consider him his favourite customer. Otto has a crush on Tabitha, but unfortunately, she finds him disgusting due to his bad habit of nose-picking.
 Kirsten McBradden (voiced by Sugar Lyn Beard) - Kirsten is a red-headed sweet girl who really believes in Captain Flamingo and is even doing a project on him for school and once became the subject of a play where only he had speaking lines. She asks him all sorts of fangirl questions, always proceeded by, "I was just wondering...", and like Lizbeth, she has a huge crush on Milo and often concocts fake troubles to get Milo to "rescue" her and to possibly spend time with him. Her crush on Milo seems to border a bit on the psychotic and Milo seems more aware of her crush than he is of Lizbeth's. Her last name was revealed to be McBradden in the episode "Bug Out".
 Ruth-Ann (voiced by Annick Obonsawin) - Ruth is Lizbeth's doppelganger-like rival; her blonde hair is even parted on the opposite side of Lizbeth. Where Lizbeth is spunky, Ruth is a shrinking violet. Where Lizbeth is straightforward, Ruth is the queen of the backhanded compliment. Worse yet, Ruth has Milo wrapped around her finger, and she strings him along like she does all the other boys in town. Ruth makes Lizbeth seethe, and more than once Lizbeth has voted not to rescue her nemesis because Lizbeth knows if Ruth runs off with Milo's heart, she'll just break it. So she fights Ruth for her square-shaped boy every time. She is the most popular girl at school and tells people what's hot and what's not and has telekinetic powers. She wants to be an actress.

Minor
 Mth Greegron Ifsqamineus Rasitrkk: (voiced by Julie Lemieux) Mth is a kid from an unknown country who calls Captain Flamingo over so he can help find the Globnick which means a friend (because he cannot speak English). Captain Flamingo befriends Mth in "The Globnick".
 Thrasher: (voiced by Noam Zylberman) Thrasher is an Inuit kid who calls Captain Flamingo for help so he finds his missing electric guitar in "Flamingopalooza".
 Warrior Monkey: (voiced by Juan Chioran) Warrior Monkey is a former circus monkey who turned evil after his abandonment in a pet shop. He blamed Captain Flamingo for all of his problems.

Episodes

Series overview

Season 1 (2006-07)

Season 2 (2007)

Season 3 (2008)

Telecast and home media
Captain Flamingo was first premiered on YTV on February 7, 2006, and ended on April 17, 2008, with the final episode. In repeats, Canadian Nickeldoeon also aired from November 2, 2009 (launch date) until June 3, 2013.
In the U.S., Toon Disney premiered this show on January 28, 2008, at 8:30 AM, although it was initially going for broadcast during their Jetix programming block. Captain Flamingo was removed from the Toon Disney schedule on August 12, 2008, but returned on September 2 at 5:30 a.m. When Toon Disney was rebranded to Disney XD on February 13, 2009, Captain Flamingo was once again removed, and hasn't aired in the U.S. since the future years.

As of 2022, the show is now streaming on both Peacock and Tubi.

In May 2006, Jetix Europe acquired the European and Middle Eastern pay-TV rights, in addition to television distribution, (serviced by Buena Vista International Television on behalf of the network) home video and consumer product rights to the series in the said territories, except for Spain and Portugal. Therefore, it started airing on European channels of the network, excluding France, in Autumn 2006.

The three DVD releases of the show were released on June 29, 2011, only in region four. Each release contained only fourteen episodes from the first season. But other regional releases have not yet been released.

References

External links
 
 Captain Flamingo at YTV.com
 Official Fan Site

2000s Canadian animated television series
2006 Canadian television series debuts
2006 Philippine television series debuts
2008 Canadian television series endings
2008 Philippine television series endings
Animated television series about children
Anime-influenced Western animated television series
Canadian children's animated comedy television series
Canadian children's animated fantasy television series
Canadian children's animated superhero television series
Canadian flash animated television series
Canadian superhero comedy television series
Child superheroes
English-language television shows
Fantasy comedy television series
Fictional characters with extrasensory perception
Philippine animated television series
Philippine children's television series
Philippine comedy television series
Philippine fantasy television series
Philippine flash animated television series
Television series by 9 Story Media Group
Television series by Corus Entertainment
Television shows set in Toronto
YTV (Canadian TV channel) original programming